Corliss Leendert Waitman is a Belgian-born American football punter for the Denver Broncos of the National Football League (NFL). He played college football at South Alabama.

Early life
Waitman's mother's family is from Suriname. His father, José Waitman, was a professional basketball player, and was playing in Belgium when Corliss was born. The family moved to the Netherlands, where Corliss spent his childhood. When he was 15, he moved to the United States to join his father. Waitman switched from playing soccer to football in high school.

College career
Waitman played college football at South Alabama from 2014–2018. In February 2019, he transferred to Mississippi State University. However, the NCAA denied Waitman an extra year of eligibility, and he did not play college football in 2019.

Professional career

Pittsburgh Steelers
Waitman was signed by the Pittsburgh Steelers as an undrafted free agent on April 28, 2020. He was waived on September 5, 2020 and re-signed to the practice squad. He signed a reserve/future contract on January 14, 2021. He was waived on May 3, 2021.

Las Vegas Raiders
On July 26, 2021, Waitman was signed by the Las Vegas Raiders. He was waived on August 23, 2021.

New England Patriots
On November 23, 2021, Waitman was signed to the New England Patriots practice squad.

Pittsburgh Steelers (second stint)
Waitman was signed by the Pittsburgh Steelers off the Patriots practice squad on December 25, 2021, when Steelers punter Pressley Harvin III took bereavement leave. He made his NFL debut in the team's week 16 loss against the Kansas City Chiefs the following day. He was waived on January 15, 2022.

Denver Broncos
On January 17, 2022, Waitman was claimed off waivers by the Denver Broncos.

Waitman was also drafted by the Edmonton Elks in the third round (20th overall) of the 2022 CFL Global Draft.

Waitman was named the starting punter for the Broncos on August 29, 2022, after veteran punter Sam Martin was released. In Week 3, Waitman punted 10 times, six of them inside the 20-yard line, in an 11-10 win over the San Francisco 49ers, earning AFC Special Teams Player of the Week.

References

External links
Denver Broncos bio
South Alabama Jaguars bio

1995 births
Living people
American football punters
South Alabama Jaguars football players
Sportspeople of Surinamese descent
Pittsburgh Steelers players
Players of American football from Florida
Las Vegas Raiders players
New England Patriots players
People from Milton, Florida
Denver Broncos players
Belgian people of Surinamese descent
Belgian players of American football